Benjamin Joseph Hill (born May 17, 1973) is an American college basketball coach and former head men's basketball coach at the University of Northern Colorado. He began coaching the Bears in  2010–11, when he guided them to the school's first-ever NCAA Division I tournament berth, where they would lose in the Round of 64. He won the Big Sky Conference Coach of the Year that season.

Hill and his entire staff were fired after the 2015–16 season upon the discovery of numerous NCAA rules violations. He was found to have personally completed coursework for a prospect and enlisted a trainer to do the same. In addition, nine members of his staff completed coursework for players, paid for prospects' classes, and arranged for off-campus practices with an academically ineligible player. In December 2017, Hill received a six-year show-cause penalty, effectively banning him from coaching at an NCAA member school during that time.

Head coaching record

References

1973 births
Living people
American men's basketball coaches
American men's basketball players
College men's basketball head coaches in the United States
Grand View Vikings men's basketball players
Junior college men's basketball coaches in the United States
Junior college men's basketball players in the United States
NCAA sanctions
Northern Colorado Bears men's basketball coaches
South Dakota State Jackrabbits men's basketball coaches